Eilema crassicosta is a moth of the subfamily Arctiinae. It was described by Hervé de Toulgoët in 1957. It is found on Madagascar.

This species has a wing length of 10 mm and a wingspan of 22 mm.

References

crassicosta
Moths described in 1957